The 2007 Northern Iowa Panthers football team represented the University of Northern Iowa in the 2007 NCAA Division I FCS football season.  The team was coached by Mark Farley and played their home games in the UNI-Dome. The Panthers clinched a share of the Gateway Football Conference and a playoff berth with a win against Missouri State on November 3.

Facts
The Panthers moved into the top spot in The Sports Network's FCS Top 25 poll on October 15. It marked the first time the Panthers had been perched in the No. 1 spot in the nation since the Sports Network's poll on November 5, 1992.
On November 19, UNI became the consensus No. 1-ranked team in the nation after taking over the top spot in the FCS Coaches poll.
On November 8, Northern Iowa was ranked 30th in the nation in the Sagarin ratings. The Sagarin ratings take into account all members of Division I football.
UNI became the first-ever Gateway Football Conference school to win all six of its regular season road contests in a single season.
University of Northern Iowa (11–0) topped the bracket as the top seed after capturing the automatic qualifying berth from the Gateway Football Conference. The Panthers are making their 13th tournament appearance.
For the first time in school history the University of Northern Iowa football team drew a seed for the NCAA Football Championship Subdivision playoffs.
In scoring its first win over Iowa State since 1994, UNI improved its record against teams from the Football Bowl Subdivision (formerly Division I-A) to 9–15 since 1985.
On November 18, Northern Iowa received points in the Associated Press Top 25 poll. They received 1 point; that vote came from Ray Ratto of the San Francisco Chronicle. The Panthers became the second FCS school to receive votes in the poll, following Appalachian State who had received up to 19 votes earlier in the season.
In 23 years of league play, UNI has now captured at least a share of the Gateway Football Conference title in 13 of those seasons with nine of those being outright championships.
UNI completed the first-ever perfect regular season in the 23-year history of the Gateway Football Conference with a record of 11–0. UNI's 6–0 mark in Gateway play marked the ninth time in league history a team went undefeated against conference competition. It was the fifth time UNI has completed Gateway play with an unblemished record.
OL Chad Rinehart was named to the Senior Bowl North team.

Schedule

Rankings

Coaching staff

Team players drafted into the NFL

References

Northern Iowa
Northern Iowa Panthers football seasons
Missouri Valley Football Conference champion seasons
Northern Iowa Panthers football